P. bidentata may refer to:

 Paramoera bidentata, an amphipod crustacean
 Perforatella bidentata, a land snail
 Phaonia bidentata, a fly first described in 1933
 Phoneyusa bidentata, a large arachnid
 Piranga bidentata, an American songbird
 Pyrene bidentata, a sea snail